Tahoe is the second studio album by American musician Fred Warmsley, under the alias Dedekind Cut. It was released on February 23, 2018, by Kranky.

Critical reception
Tahoe was met with "generally favorable" reviews from critics. At Metacritic, which assigns a weighted average rating out of 100 to reviews from mainstream publications, this release received an average score of 75, based on 8 reviews. Aggregator Album of the Year gave the release a 75 out of 100 based on a critical consensus of 6 reviews.

Track listing

References

2018 albums
Fred Warmsley albums
Albums produced by Fred Warmsley